Evening at the Grange is an EP by Lida Husik and Beaumont Hannant, released on November 8, 1994 through Astralwerks.

Track listing

Personnel 
Musicians
Beaumont Hannant – keyboards, production
Lida Husik – vocals, guitar
Production and additional personnel
Richard Brown – production, engineering
Wendi Horowitz – design
Tom Merwin – illustrations
Norbert Vogel – design

References

External links 
 

1994 EPs
Astralwerks albums
Lida Husik albums